Ballatha Pahayan is a 1969 Indian Malayalam-language film, directed and produced by T. S. Muthaiah. The film stars Prem Nazir, Jayabharathi, Thikkurissy Sukumaran Nair and Manavalan Joseph. The film had musical score by K. V. Job.

Cast

Prem Nazir as Subair
Jayabharathi as Salma
Thikkurissy Sukumaran Nair as Hajiyaar
Manavalan Joseph as Porinchu
Sankaradi as Kaaranavar
Changanasseri Chinnamma
Abhayam
Baby Indira as Sulekha
Bahadoor as Aliyaar
C. R. Lakshmi
K. P. Ummer as Rajan
Masood
Master Sridhar
Meena as Mymoon
Paravoor Bharathan as Adraan
S. P. Pillai as Pillai
Sakunthala
T. K. Balachandran as Chandran
Usharani

Soundtrack
The music was composed by K. V. Job and the lyrics were written by Sreekumaran Thampi.

References

External links
 

1969 films
1960s Malayalam-language films